Johan Einar "Eino" Railio (11 June 1886 – 3 February 1970) was a Finnish gymnast who won bronze in the 1908 Summer Olympics.

He finnicized his familyname from Dahlgren to Railio in 1906.

He married Agnes Lovisa Nikander (née Malm) (1885–1976).

He is buried in the Malmi Cemetery in Helsinki.

Sources

References

1886 births
1970 deaths
Finnish male artistic gymnasts
Gymnasts at the 1908 Summer Olympics
Olympic gymnasts of Finland
Olympic bronze medalists for Finland
Olympic medalists in gymnastics
Medalists at the 1908 Summer Olympics
Sportspeople from Helsinki
20th-century Finnish people